The Tax and Customs Administration is the tax collection and customs service of the Kingdom of the Netherlands. It is part of the Ministry of Finance and is responsible for levying and collecting taxes in the Netherlands.

Besides tax revenue, other operational areas of the Tax and Customs Administration include:
 Customs, supervising the import, export and transit of goods through the Netherlands
 Toeslagen, paying out income-related benefits for childcare, rent and health care
 The Fiscal Information and Investigation Service (FIOD)

The Tax and Customs Administration was founded as an organisation in 1805; it falls under the political responsibility of the Minister of Finance. Two State Secretaries within the Ministry of Finance in the Fourth Rutte cabinet work with the Tax and Customs Administration.

In addition to the government tax service, there are many other tax authorities, such as the municipal tax authorities that deal with the collection and collection of local taxes.

Role 

The Tax and Customs Administration is responsible for raising the income of the government. From this income, general provisions are paid, such as roads, schools and certain benefits (assistance, allowances, child allowance). Furthermore, many subsidies from, notably, theatre companies and sports clubs are paid from the general funds.

Organisation 

The Director-General (DG) and the Deputy Director-General (pDG) are in charge of the Tax and Customs Administration. The underlying services from the primary process are managed directly by the Director General. The non-primary processes are largely controlled by the pDG.

Small arms 

Customs Agents are armed with Walther P5 pistols, as for the National Police and the Royal Marechaussee.

See also
 Dutch childcare benefits scandal

References

Revenue services
Customs services
National law enforcement agencies of the Netherlands